The 2022–23 Lebanese FA Cup is the 50th edition of the national football cup competition of Lebanon. It started with the round of 16 on 16 December 2022, and will end in 2023 with the final.

Lebanese Premier League side Nejmeh were the defending champions, having won the 2021–22 edition.

Teams

Round of 16

Bracket 
The following is the bracket which the Lebanese FA Cup resembled. Numbers in parentheses next to the score represents the results of a penalty shoot-out.

References

External links 
 Global Sports Archive
 RSSSF
 Goalzz

 
Lebanese FA Cup seasons
FA Cup
Lebanese FA Cup
Lebanese FA Cup